Jennifer Jacquet is an associate professor of environmental studies at New York University.

Life
Born in 1980, she grew up in Ohio.
She graduated from Western Washington University, from Cornell University, and from University of British Columbia.

She read at the New York State Writers Institute. She appeared at WIRED2015, in October 2015.

Works
 The Playbook. How to Deny Science, Sell Lies, and Make a Killing in the Corporate World. Pantheon 2022, ISBN 978-1101871010.

References

External links

http://www.salon.com/writer/jennifer_jacquet/
https://archive.today/20130130011654/http://news.mongabay.com/2008/0908-hance_interview_jacquet.html
http://bobmorris.biz/a-rough-mix-an-edge-conversation-with-brian-eno-and-jennifer-jacquet

Living people
New York University faculty
Western Washington University alumni
Cornell University alumni
University of British Columbia alumni
Environmental studies scholars
Year of birth missing (living people)